was a Japanese astronomer, who, together with astronomer Okuro Oikawa, co-discovered the Mars-crosser asteroid 1139 Atami in 1929.

During the Japanese period in Taiwan, he was president of the Astronomical Association, Taiwan Branch beginning in 1938. He began to build "New High Mountain Observatory" (新高山 天文台) in 1942, but died the following year.

References 
 

1903 births
1943 deaths
Discoverers of asteroids
20th-century Japanese astronomers